White Gold (German: Weißes Gold) is a 1949 Austrian drama film directed by Eduard von Borsody and starring Heinrich Gretler, Alma Seidler and Robert Freitag.

The film's art direction was by Julius von Borsody.

Cast

References

Bibliography 
 Fritsche, Maria. Homemade Men in Postwar Austrian Cinema: Nationhood, Genre and Masculinity. Berghahn Books, 2013.

External links 
 

1949 films
1940s German-language films
Films directed by Eduard von Borsody
1949 drama films
Austrian drama films
Austrian black-and-white films